

Medalists

Qualification

Qualification rule: qualification standard 1.96m or at least best 8 qualified

Final

High jump at the World Athletics Indoor Championships
High Jump Women
2008 in women's athletics